Acidic leucine-rich nuclear phosphoprotein 32 family member E is a protein that in humans is encoded by the ANP32E gene. The ANP32E gene is located on chromosome 1q22. In mammalian cells, ANP32E has been shown to be an  H2A.Z chaperone capable of promoting the removal of H2A.Z from chromatin. In brain tissue, ANP32E together with Cpd1 regulate protein phosphatase 2A activity at synapses during synaptogenesis and has been observed to form a complex with ANP32A and SET that stabilizes short-lived mRNAs containing AU-rich elements, as well as having acetyltransferase inhibitory activity (in a complex with SET) and having a role in chromatin remodeling and transcriptional regulation.

See also
 ANP32A, ANP32B, ANP32C, ANP32D

References

External links

Further reading